Ibrahim Kodbuur District is a district in Hargeisa, Somaliland. It is one of the eight administrative districts of Hargeisa City. Ibrahim Kodbuur was a senior commander of the Somali National Movement and led a rescue operation to free another senior member from police custody in the 1980s.

See also

References

Districts of Hargeisa